Lincoln Theatre may refer to:

In the United States

 Lincoln Theater (Los Angeles, California), listed on the National Register of Historic Places (NRHP)
 Lincoln Theater (Yountville, California)
 Lincoln Theatre (New Haven, Connecticut), NRHP-listed
 Lincoln Theatre (Washington, D.C.), NRHP-listed
 Lincoln Theatre (Miami Beach, Florida)
 Lincoln Theatre (Decatur, Illinois), mentioned in an episode of Most Terrifying Places in America
 Lincoln Theater (Baton Rouge, Louisiana), NRHP-listed in East Baton Rouge Parish
 Lincoln Theatre (Harlem), New York City, New York
 Lincoln Theatre Guild, Lincoln County, North Carolina
 Lincoln Theatre (Raleigh, North Carolina), a music venue in Raleigh, North Carolina
 Lincoln Theatre (Columbus, Ohio), NRHP-listed
 Lincoln Theatre (Philadelphia), originally the Dunbar Theatre, a 1920s–1940s jazz club in Philadelphia, Pennsylvania
 Lincoln Theatre (Marion, Virginia), NRHP-listed
 Lincoln Theatre (Mount Vernon, Washington), NRHP-listed
Lincoln Theater (Charleston, North Carolina), a theater managed by Ireland Thomas